José Restrepo may refer to:
 José Restrepo (wrestler), Colombian wrestler
 José Manuel Restrepo Vélez, Colombian botanist, politician and historian
 José Manuel Restrepo Abondano, Colombian academic, economist, journalist and politician

See also
 José Reynal-Restrepo, Colombian priest